Francisco Rivera (born 15 May 1951) is a Paraguayan footballer. He played in five matches for the Paraguay national football team from 1975 to 1976. He was also part of Paraguay's squad for the 1975 Copa América tournament.

References

1951 births
Living people
Paraguayan footballers
Paraguay international footballers
Association football midfielders
Sportspeople from Asunción
Deportivo Santaní managers